BPM may refer to:

 Beats per minute (heart rate), the number of heartbeats detected during one minute
 Beats per minute, a measurement of tempo in music
 Body positivity movement, a movement that began in the United States to promote body positivity

Business
 Banca Popolare di Mantova, an defunct Italian bank, a subsidiary of Banca Popolare di Milano
 Banca Popolare di Milano, an Italian bank
 Banco BPM, an Italian banking group
 Bank Pertanian Malaysia, a financial institution in Malaysia
 Banque Populaire Maroco Centrafricaine, a major bank in the Central African Republic
 Bataafse Petroleum Maatschappij, a Dutch oil company
 Beardmore Precision Motorcycles, a British motorcycle manufacturer
 Business performance management
 Business process management
 Business process modeling

Entertainment
 BPM (band), an American band
 BPM (Beats per Minute), a 2017 French film
 BPM (magazine), an American magazine
 BPM (Sirius XM), a satellite radio channel
 Beats Per Minute (website), a New York-based publication
 BPM (album), by Salvador Sobral, 2021
 B.P.M., a B-side to "I Believe In You" by Kylie Minogue, 2004
 Ball Park Music, an Australian indie rock band
 BPM: Bullets Per Minute, a 2021 video game

Technology
 BPM (time service), a short-wave time service of the People's Republic of China
 Beam propagation method, a numerical tool for electromagnetic analysis
 Bit-patterned media, a potential future hard disk drive technology to record data in magnetic islands
 Bruce Proper Motion Survey, a star catalogue
 Business process management, a discipline in operations management

Other
 Banff Park Museum
 Begumpet Airport, Hyderabad, India (IATA airport code BPM)
 Beta Phi Mu, international honor society for library science and information technology
 Border Personnel Meeting